Aq Kand (also Romanized as Āq Kand and Āqkand; also known as  Ak-Kend) is a village in Qareh Poshtelu-e Bala Rural District, Qareh Poshtelu District, Zanjan County, Zanjan Province, Iran. At the 2006 census, its population was 188, in 50 families.

References 

Populated places in Zanjan County